US Nuclear Corporation is a US radiation detection holding company headquartered in Canoga Park, CA specializing in the development and manufacturing of radiation detection instrumentation. It supplies instrumentation to nuclear power plants, national laboratories, government agencies, homeland security, military and weapon makers, universities and schools, research companies, hospitals, as well as energy companies.

Products
Products include:
Radiation Air and Water Monitors
Aerial reconnaissance
alpha, beta, gamma and tritium monitors
DroneRAD aerial radiation detection
Vehicle monitors, personnel monitors, exit monitors and room monitors
Radon air monitors and radon switch products
Handheld survey meters and personal dosimeters
Pocket micro-R meters
Port security equipment
software solutions

Operating divisions
US Nuclear Corp has three divisions:
Technical Associates, founded in 1946 as a spin off from the Manhattan Project, built the first industrial grade radiation monitors.
Overhoff Technology Corporation, design and manufacturing of high quality tritium monitors
Electronic Control Concepts (ECC), X-ray equipment

See also
 Radioactivity

References

External links
http://www.usnuclearcorp.com/
http://www.nasdaq.com/symbol/ucle

Nuclear industry